Biwia springeri  is a species of ray-finned fish in the genus Biwia found in North and South Korea.

Named in honor of ichthyologist Victor G. Springer (b. 1928), U.S. National Museum, who collected the type specimen.

References

Biwia
Cyprinid fish of Asia
Fish of Korea
Taxa named by Petre Mihai Bănărescu
Taxa named by Teodor T. Nalbant
Fish described in 1973